Sajra and Gojra forts are hill forts built on top of Naammam Malai hill to the east of Vellore City in the state of Tamil Nadu, India. Sajra and Gojra literally means "smart" and "cute" respectively.

History
In 1678, during the siege of Vellore Fort by Chhatrapati Shivaji's army, the commandant of the Vellore Fort Abdulla Khan (Abyssinian) defended the fort. Chhatrapati Shivaji deputed his Sardar Sabnis Narhari Rudra with 2000 cavalry and 5000 infantry to continue the siege which lasted fourteen months. He built two small forts, Sajra and Gojra on the hill top which is nearly 2 km from the Vellore Fort. These forts dominated the lower Vellore Fort allowing it to be effectively bombarded. It is said out of the original 500 soldiers defending the fort 400 perished. Abdulla Khan surrendered the Vellore Fort on 21 August 1678, and the Maratha Empire strengthened the Vellore Fort's fortifications, ruling for 30 years.
{
  "type": "FeatureCollection",
  "features": [
    {
      "type": "Feature",
      "properties": {},
      "geometry": {
        "type": "Point",
        "coordinates": [
          79.144546507741,
          12.925113928206
        ]
      }
    },
    {
      "type": "Feature",
      "properties": {},
      "geometry": {
        "type": "Point",
        "coordinates": [
          79.144220352173,
          12.916271330231
        ]
      }
    },
    {
      "type": "Feature",
      "properties": {},
      "geometry": {
        "type": "Point",
        "coordinates": [
          79.128925322439,
          12.921123502631
        ]
      }
    },
    {
      "type": "Feature",
      "properties": {},
      "geometry": {
        "type": "LineString",
        "coordinates": [
          [
            79.144374848984,
            12.925682788093
          ],
          [
            79.129886627197,
            12.921299184162
          ],
          [
            79.143928528356,
            12.916681259021
          ]
        ]
      }
    }
  ]
}

See also 

 Vellore
 Vellore Fort
 Jalakandeswarar Temple, Vellore
 St. John's Church, Vellore
 List of forts in India

References

External links

Forts in Tamil Nadu
Maratha Empire
Shivaji